The Sunni Revival was a period in Islamic history marked by the revival of the political fortunes of Sunni Islam, a renewed interest in Sunni law and theology and the spread of new styles in art and architecture. Conventionally, the revival lasted from 1055 until 1258.

Richard Bulliet has proposed that the term "recentering" better describes the period than "revival" or "renaissance". The period is characterized as much by developments within Sunnism as by Sunni relations with Shia Islam. In particular, it was a period of homogenization of Sunnism as scholars and leaders strove for ijmāʿ (consensus). Some scholars have argued that the Sunni Revival led to the decline of scientific output in the Islamic world.

Timing
The Sunni Revival followed a period of Shia ascendancy, sometimes called the "Shia Century", under the Fatimid dynasty in Africa, Palestine and parts of Arabia; the Hamdanid dynasty in Syria; and the Buyid dynasty in Iraq and Iran. During this period, Shia polities controlled most of the Islamic world, including its core areas. The Abbasid Caliph, the supreme Sunni leader, was under the control of the Buyids, who governed Baghdad, while the Sharif of Mecca was under the authority of the Fatimids.

The religious revival began under the Abbasid caliph al-Qadir. Although subject to the Buyids and politically powerless, he managed to steer an increasingly independent course in religious issues. Backed by the Hanbali traditionalists, al-Qadir transformed the caliphate into the champion of Sunnism, condemning Shia and rationalist (Mu'tazilite) beliefs with which previous Abbasid caliphs had partially sympathized. The so-called "Qadiri Creed", formulated in 1018, was the first articulation of Sunni beliefs in their own right, rather than defined in opposition to the Shia.

The Sunni Revival became a political movement when the Sunni Seljuk Turks conquered Baghdad from the Buyids in 1055, saving Caliph al-Qa'im from being overthrown by the Shia. The period of Seljuk domination lasted roughly a century, until about 1150. They were definitively ousted from Baghdad in 1157. Thereafter a period of Abbasid resurgence and ecumenism followed until the Mongols sacked Baghdad in 1258.

Spread
The chief architect of the political and legal Sunni revival was Nizam al-Mulk (d. 1092), vizier of the Seljuk Empire. He founded the school which took his name, the Nizamiyya of Baghdad. The chief architect of the theological revival, al-Ghazali (d. 1111), taught at Nizam's school in Baghdad. This was not the first madrasa, but it was by far the most influential and nizamiyya fashioned after that in Baghdad were founded wherever the Sunni revival spread. They were a major factor in the homogenization of Sunnism during the revival.

The figure most associated with the Sunni Revival in Syria is Nur ad-Din (d. 1174), who built twenty madrasas in Damascus. In 1171, Saladin, originally a general of Nur ad-Din, abolished the Fatimid Caliphate and brought Egypt into the Sunni fold. His Ayyubid dynasty vigorously strengthened Sunnism in Syria, Palestine and Egypt.

Notes

Bibliography

 
 

Historical eras
History of Islam
Sunni Islam
Nizari Ismaili–Seljuk relations
11th century in the Middle East
12th century in the Middle East